Harry Ledingham-Horn (born 9 December 2003) is a British track cyclist.

Career
Ledingham-Horn began his cycling career with Lyme RC.

He came to prominence after winning two national titles at the 2023 British Cycling National Track Championships. He won the Sprint and the Team sprint.

Major results
2023
National Track Championships
1st  Sprint
1st  Team sprint

References

2003 births
Living people
British male cyclists
British track cyclists